Inconstant was a wooden full-rigged sailing ship built in 1848 at Cape Breton, Nova Scotia which later became known as "Plimmer's Ark" and played an important role in the development of Wellington, New Zealand. The ship's hull remains in Wellington today as an important archaeological site.

Built by George Old at Big Bras d'Or, Nova Scotia Inconstant was one of largest wooden ships ever built in Cape Breton Island, Nova Scotia and the largest ship built by Old, a shipbuilder who started with schooners before focusing mainly on brigs. The ship was sold to owners in London, England and made a voyage to Australia carrying immigrants. On a subsequent Australian voyage, she was wrecked at Wellington, New Zealand in 1851 when she put in for water and ran aground.

After the ship was deemed too badly damaged to sail again, the hull was purchased by John Plimmer, an entrepreneur later known as "the Father of Wellington". The hull was converted to a prominent wharf on the Wellington waterfront where it became known as "Plimmer's Ark". Linked to the shore by a bridge the ship served as one of the first piers in Wellington with the interior serving as a warehouse and auction room. It also served as a bonded customs store, immigration pier and office for the first Wellington harbourmaster. A light mounted at the seaward side of the ship became the first harbour light in Wellington.

The hull later became a ship chandlery and gradually became landlocked between 1857 and 1860 as the Wellington waterfront was expanded. Inconstant became surrounded by Lambton Quay, Customhouse Quay and Willis Street in a wedge shaped piece of land. The upper works were demolished in 1883 and the lower hull disappeared under the first Bank of New Zealand. In the late 1990s when a new commercial development ('Old Bank Arcade') was built on the bank site, the remains of the hull were discovered and excavated by archaeologists. The lower bilges of the ship were found, running  from bow to stern. Several important early Canadian shipbuilding features were documented including the use of birch for main ship timbers some of which still bore layers of birch bark. The bow of the hull was preserved under glass and displayed with various associated artifacts in the arcade of the new development.

Kirkcaldie & Stains opened for business on 9 December 1863 in a portion of the Ark named Waterloo House.

References

John Parker, Cape Breton Ships and Men, (London: Hazell Watson & Viney, 1967) p. 75, p. 178.

External links
Plimmer's Ark website
 Parks Canada Ship Information Database Registry Information, ship Inconstant, official no. 9012761
 "Plimmer's Ark", Museum of Wellington
 Peter Wells, "The Ship Under the Old Bank Building" City, My City

Maritime history of Canada
Maritime history of New Zealand
Wellington City
Buildings and structures in Wellington City
Tall ships of Canada
Individual sailing vessels
Ships built in Nova Scotia
Victorian-era merchant ships of Canada
Sailing ships of Canada
History of the Cape Breton Regional Municipality
Archaeological sites in New Zealand
Full-rigged ships
Wellington Harbour
1850s in Wellington